Stamatopoulos ("son of Stamatis or Stamatos") is a Greek surname with the feminine form being Stamatopoulou (Σταματοπούλου). It is the surname of:

 Adamantia Stamatopoulou ("Mando") (born 1966), Greek singer
 Alexandra Stamatopoulou (born 1986), Greek Paralympic swimmer
 Dino Stamatopoulos (born 1964), Greek-American television writer and producer
 Efstratios Stamatopoulos, the true name of the Greek writer Stratis Myrivilis (1890–1969)
 Kyriakos Stamatopoulos (born 1979), Greek-Canadian football goalkeeper
 Maria Stamatopoulou, Greek archaeologist

See also
 John Stamos, American musician and actor whose surname is an abbreviation of Stamatopoulos

Greek-language surnames
Surnames